The 1939 Catholic University Cardinals football team was an American football team that represented the Catholic University of America as an independent during the 1939 college football season. Led by 10th-year head coach Dutch Bergman, the Cardinals compiled an 8–1–1 record, shut out five opponents (including four in their first five contests), and outscored all opponents by a total of 229 to 73. 

The team's victories included games against the Detroit Titans, Miami Hurricanes, and Tulsa Golden Hurricane.

The Cardinals were invited to play in the 1940 Sun Bowl in El Paso, Texas, on New Year's Day 1940. In the first and only meeting between the two programs, Catholic University played Arizona State to a scoreless tie.

Key players included brothers Rocco Pirro, a fullback, and Carmen Pirro, a tackle.

Schedule

References

Catholic University
Catholic University Cardinals football seasons
Catholic University Cardinals football